Sidastrum is a genus of flowering plants belonging to the family Malvaceae.

Its native range is Tropical and Subtropical America.

Species
Species:

Sidastrum burrerense 
Sidastrum lodiegense 
Sidastrum micranthum 
Sidastrum multiflorum 
Sidastrum paniculatum 
Sidastrum quinquenervium 
Sidastrum strictum 
Sidastrum tehuacanum

References

Malveae
Malvaceae genera